The Régional 1 (previously known as Division d'Honneur) is the common generic name for the highest level football league competitions run by each of the 13 Regional Leagues in France. Together, these league competitions serve as the sixth division of the French football league system, promoting clubs into the Championnat National 3, subject to certain criteria being met.

The name is also given to the highest level football league competitions in the French overseas territories of Guadeloupe, French Guiana, Martinique, Mayotte and Réunion.

Prior to the formation of a Championnat de France Amateur in 1927, the Division d'Honneur leagues were the highest level of league competition in France, and from 1932 (when Championnat de France Amateur was converted to become the top professional league) until the formation of the National League in 1970 they remained the highest level of amateur football.

Each region administers its own league to its own rules and is free to give their own name to their Division d'Honneur.

Some clubs that participate in the league are semi-professional. The competition is open to qualifying reserve or academy teams of all clubs whose first team participates at a higher level in the league system.

Leagues 

The 2020–21 season of the Regional leagues was declared void by the FFF on 24 March 2021, having been suspended since October 2020 due to the COVID-19 pandemic in France. No promotions or relegations were enacted.

Overseas leagues 

The Guadeloupean League, French Guiana League, and the Martinican League are associated to CONCACAF.

The Reunionese League is associated to CAF and Mayotte League is a non-affiliated league.

Guadeloupe

Guyane

Martinique

Mayotte

Réunion

Saint-Pierre-et-Miquelon

References

External links
Official FFF site

6
Fra